Diego Castro (born 10 October 1961) is a Chilean former professional footballer who played as a forward or attacking midfielder for clubs in Chile, the United States and Germany.

Club career
Then he moved to the United States in 1982 and played for the semi-professional club Garden Grove Galactica and Chicago Sting, where he coincided with the German player Hans Weiner, who suggested him to make a trial in Germany.

He went to Germany and joined Hertha Berlin in 1984, where he coincided with players such as Andreas Köpke,  and Hans Weiner, becoming the first Chilean to play in the German football. He made his debut in a friendly match against Tennis Borussia Berlin on 30 July. According to Hertha BSC Stiftung (Hertha BSC Foundation), Castro made 22 appearances in the 1984–85 2. Bundesliga, 3 appearances in the DFB-Pokal and 2 appearances in friendlies, where he scored a goal against .

Castro returned to the United States and made a career in indoor soccer, playing for Dallas Sidekicks, Wichita Wings, Memphis Storm and Houston Hotshots.

International career
He took part of Chile at under-20 level, with Carlos Campos as coach.

Coaching career
Following his retirement, he graduated as a soccer manager and started a football academy what provides players to universities. Since then he has development an extensive career as coach in the United States at youth level.

Personal life
He attended to university at the age of 16 and studied chemistry and pharmacy for 3 years before switching to professional football.

His mother was a well-known Doctor of Linguistics who lived in the United States and before in London, England, where Castro also lived with her.

Castro married in the United States and made his home in Texas. He works alongside his wife, Kathy. His son, Jackson, is also a footballer.

References

External links
 Diego Castro at NASLJerseys.com
 Diego Castro at FussballDaten.de 
 Diego Castro at KicksFan.com

1961 births
Living people
People from Constitución, Chile
Chilean footballers
Chilean expatriate footballers
Chile under-20 international footballers
C.D. Aviación footballers
Chicago Sting (NASL) players
Chicago Sting (MISL) players
Hertha BSC players
Dallas Sidekicks (original MISL) players
Wichita Wings (MISL) players
Memphis Storm players
Houston Hotshots players
Chilean Primera División players
Primera B de Chile players
North American Soccer League (1968–1984) players
Major Indoor Soccer League (1978–1992) players
2. Bundesliga players
National Professional Soccer League (1984–2001) players
Continental Indoor Soccer League players
Chilean expatriate sportspeople in the United States
Chilean expatriate sportspeople in Germany
Expatriate soccer players in the United States
Expatriate footballers in Germany
Association football forwards
Association football midfielders
Chilean football managers
Chilean expatriate football managers
Expatriate soccer managers in the United States